The church of the Most Precious Blood of Our Lord Jesus Christ is a place of Catholic worship in Rome, seat of the parish, in the Tor di Quinto neighborhood, in Via Flaminia.

History

The parish was erected October 22, 1957 with the decree of the Cardinal Vicar Clemente Micara "Etsi antistitem" and belongs to the Prefecture XIII. The parish was visited by Pope John Paul II, who celebrated the Mass on 17 October 1993. Pope Benedict XVI established it as cardinal title of Preziossimo Sangue di Nostro Signore Gesú Cristo with John Njue as its first and incumbent cardinal-protector since 2007.

Cardinal Priest
Pope Benedict XVI established it as titular church since 24 November 2007.

John Njue, 24 November 2007 appointed - present

References
Pope Benedict XVI established it as titular church

External links
Preziossimo Sangue di Nostro Signore Gesú Cristo

Titular churches
Rome Q. XVIII Tor di Quinto
Roman Catholic churches completed in 1957
20th-century Roman Catholic church buildings in Italy
Holy Blood churches